Federico Guillermo Gil (1915 – 2000) was a political scientist and founder and president of the Latin American Studies Association and a recipient of its Kalman Silvert Award for outstanding lifetime service to Latin American studies.

He held the title of Kenan Professor at the University of North Carolina at Chapel Hill.

References 

Latin Americanists
American political scientists
University of North Carolina at Chapel Hill faculty
1915 births
2000 deaths
20th-century political scientists